Thandi Brewer (d.12 June, 2019) was a South African showrunner, screenwriter, film producer, director, and script editor.

Career 
Brewer has produced about 300 hours of film in her life.  Her capital has produced over 97 million rands worth of product.

Her productions include children's series Dynamite Diepkloof Dudes, 37 Honey Street, making countrywide headlines with the first-ever lesbian kiss on South African television, the 7 x SAFTA Award-winning and International Emmy-nominated Usindiso, Sticks and Stones, the first series in the history of South African television to have audiovisual description for the blind, Bahati Close first series produced by Mnet East Africa where she headwrote and trained Kenyan and Ugandan writers, and End Game. She has been showrunning Keeping Score, a 156-part telenovela she created, which is the first telenovela that SABC 2 has done.

As a script editor she has worked with writers to produce Society SABC 1, Tiger SABC 2, Love Mnanzi Style (etv) and SAFTA-winning Borderliners S2. As one of the approved NFVF script editors and story analysts, she has helped writers hone their words on Jimmy in Pink for UK/NFVF 25 Words or less, Mama Africa and Hear Me Move for NFVF. Her work as a script doctor includes Hillside on SABC 2, One way on SABC  1, 102 Paradise Lane SABC 2, and Glory Boys MNet.  She has script doctored four international features, including a film by Luc Jacquet, Oscar-winning director of March of the Penguins, and Cheap Lives by Antony Sher.

As head of development for an international film company, she oversaw the development of 8 international features and 24 documentaries.

She was one of the founders and the first chairperson of the Writer's Guild of South Africa. 
She is passionate about Africa, African stories and their writers, having trained over 500 South African and African writers through her work as a screenwriting mentor through the NFVF screenwriting programme Spark, Mnet's East African skills transfer programme in Kenya, the short film slate for the Namibian film commission, screenwriting mentor on the NFVF/Blingola female filmmakers slate and as a previous screenwriting chair of AFDA.

Her feature film screenplays include Story of an African Farm, starring Richard E. Grant, De Gerrie for Hugh Masekela and the NFVF, and The Chemo Club, which was her directorial debut.

Biography 
Brewer was an award-winning writer, director, actress, and teacher who lived in Lower Houghton, (Hillbrow) before moving to the rural extremes of Hennops River.

She is the third generation in the South African film/TV and theatre industry and did her first gig crying for a nappy commercial at six months old.  Her grandfather was Jimmy Hunter (stand-up comic and producer of Jimmy Hunter's Brighton Follies) Her father was Bill Brewer (comic, actor, musician, composer, writer, critic on The Sunday Times) and her mother was Fiona Fraser (actress, director, writer, mentor and activist)

Thandi described her family in "Of Pigs and Psychopaths", her unpublished biography of her family:

She was born in South Africa and traveled through China, Russia, Europe, America and Africa. She had a broad knowledge of all aspects of the Arts fields, having worked in nearly all of them since she was six months old as an actress, singer, dancer, musician, writer, producer and director.

She was a well-known South African child actor, having her own radio series at 5 (Tandi Time) and acting in films like Majuba and Escape Route Cape Town.

Her stage work as writer and director includes My Mother, Myself, Two Singers - Khuluma, The History of Sex, Letters of Love, Lust and Living, Alice in Africa, Azanyan Fairytales, The Will to Die, and Alternatives Anonymous.

She won the Soundscapes competition in 1995 for Best South African play for her first play, "Samuel's Fugue". This was broadcast in 1995 and nominated for an Artes award for Best script in 1996. She then went on to write "Dynamite Diepkloof Dudes - SABC 3 for Bobby Heaney Productions; "Nodedancing," a finalist in the Xencat/Channel 4 script writing competition; and "Balls Up, a film script awarded a development grant by the Department of Arts and Culture. She was one of the young directors chosen for "Entsha/Nuwe Talente" on SABC 2 and produced the thirteen-part action/adventure series "Venture Out There" for SABC 3. She wrote "37 Honey Street," a 26-part drama series for SABC 2, which she also directed.

She wrote the international film scripts for Story of An African Farm, De Gerrie and The Chemo Club. Her second play, Please Hold I'm Coming, ran to great critical and audience acclaim at the Civic Theatre. A long-standing friendship with Ian von Memerty blossomed into a highly productive working relationship.  Together they produced Rockatutu for the South African Ballet Theatre in 2004, which segued into Music and Mayhem in 2005, Jump 4 Joy in 2006, The Heart is Round in 2007 and Gunslingers.

She was one of the 12 South African writers selected for the Sediba writer's workshop of 2005, run by Alby James.  This led to being a senior script editor for the SABC/Sediba workshop.

She was a screenwriting mentor of the NFVF Spark writers programme with Julie Hall, Mmabatho Kau, and Loyiso Maquoba.  She wrote “Usindiso/Redemption!!” which she produced in conjunction with Bridget Pickering (Co-producer of “Hotel Rwanda”). It was a regional semi finalist for best drama series for the International Emmys in 2008, won 4 SAFTAs and played to 4.3 million viewers a night on SABC 1.  She created and was the showrunner on “Sticks and “Stones” and “End Game” which flighted on SABC 1 and received enormous critical and audience acclaim. She has just completed her directorial debut with her script “The Chemo Club” which was nominated in the 2015 WGSA Muse Awards Feature film category.

She was one of the founders and the first Chair of the Writer's Guild of South Africa, as well as screenwriting Chair for AFDA. She was also involved in the SASFED (The South African Screen Federation) Executive Committee as Co-Secretaries (2009) with Khalid Shamis, and later she has the Executive Positions of Communications (2010).

Her cancer battle and double mastectomy only made her more determined to write, produce and direct more South African content.

She died on 12 June 2019.

Filmography

Writer 
 1998: Otelo Burning, by Sara Blecher – script doctor
 2004: The Story of an African Farm, by David Lister – writer
 2011: 37 Honey Street (TV series), by Alwyn Swart – writer
 2013: End Game (TV series), by Akin Omotoso – writer

Actress 
 1968: Majuba: Heuwel van Duiwe, by David Millin – Klein Johanna
 1993: African Skies (TV series)- Donna

References 

2019 deaths
South African television actresses
South African screenwriters
White South African people
Place of birth missing
Year of birth missing
Place of death missing
Women screenwriters
Deaths from cancer in South Africa